Baku Economic Region is one of the 14 economic regions of Azerbaijan. It borders the economic region of Absheron-Khizi to the west and Caspian Sea to the east. The region consists of the city district of Baku, the capital of Azerbaijan. Its population was estimated to be at 2.3 million people in January 2021.

History 
Baku Economic Region was established on 7 July 2021 as part of a reform of the economic region system of Azerbaijan. Its territory was part of the larger Absheron Economic Region prior to 2021.

References 

Economic regions of Azerbaijan